Steed Tchicamboud (born 18 June 1981) is a French former professional basketball player for who last played for SLUC Nancy Basket of the LNB Pro A.

Professional career
He played for Élan Chalon from 2010 to 2014.

On 26 November 2014 he left Chalon and signed a one-month deal with Limoges CSP. In February 2015, he left Limoges and signed with Chorale Roanne for the rest of the season.

On 12 October 2015 he signed a two-month deal with Paris-Levallois. On 9 December he parted ways with Paris.

French national team
Tchicamboud played 16 games with the senior men's French national basketball team in 2008.

He played at EuroBasket 2011, where he won the silver medal.

References

External links
 Steed Tchicamboud at Euroleague.net
 Steed Tchicamboud at FIBA.com

1981 births
Living people
Black French sportspeople
Cholet Basket players
Chorale Roanne Basket players
Élan Chalon players
French men's basketball players
Limoges CSP players
Metropolitans 92 players
Point guards
Reims Champagne Basket players
SLUC Nancy Basket players
Sportspeople from Clichy, Hauts-de-Seine